The Holocaust Museum of Greece, officially the Holocaust Memorial Museum & Educational Center of Greece on Human Rights, is a proposed museum on The Holocaust in Thessaloniki, Greece.

Construction and funding
Its construction was proposed in 2016 and is partly funded by the Federal Republic of Germany, with support from the Municipality of Thessaloniki and mayor Yiannis Boutaris. The total construction cost is estimated at €25 million ($ million). The foundation stone was placed on 30 January 2018. 

In 2022, Albert Bourla, a native of Thessaloniki and CEO of Pfizer, directed his $1 million award from the Genesis Prize for his leadership in delivering the Pfizer–BioNTech COVID-19 vaccine towards the Holocaust Museum of Greece and Holocaust education, with the particular emphasis on the fate of Greek Jewish community.

Location

The site chosen for the museum in the city is on an open plaza located at the endpoint of the rail lines and extends the walkway along Thessaloniki’s seashore, connecting the city’s harbor, the historic White Tower and the old railway station, which was used during the war for the deportation of the local Jews.

Background
In 1942 the German forces started implementing the Nuremberg Laws in the city and ordered male Jews to register at Eleftherias Square, where they were publicly tortured and humiliated before being forced into labour. A Jewish Ghetto was established near the train station. In 1943 the city's 56,000 Jews were deported, by use of 19 Holocaust trains, to Auschwitz and Bergen-Belsen concentration camps, where 43,00049,000 of them were murdered. The train journey from Thessaloniki to the concentration camps was the longest of all Holocaust trains, and Jews had to buy a ticket.

Between the 15th and early 20th centuries, Thessaloniki was the only city in Europe where Jews were a majority of the population. However, only 2,000 Jews returned after the war and less than 1,000 remain today. Overall, 80,000 Greek Jews, or 85% of the total Jewish population, were murdered in the Holocaust.

See also
History of the Jews in Greece
History of the Jews in Thessaloniki
Jewish Museum of Thessaloniki
List of Holocaust memorials and museums

References

External links
 Museum website

Museums in Thessaloniki
Jews and Judaism in Thessaloniki
The Holocaust in Greece
Holocaust museums
Museums established in 2018